Hats Off to the Buskers is the debut album by Scottish band The View. It was released on 22 January 2007 on 1965 Records. It was reported on the band's official forum that the album had leaked to various internet sites in mid December 2006. The album entered the UK Albums Chart at  1 on 28 January 2007. The album charted at No. 45 on the UK end-of-year album chart, after selling around 319,000 copies in 2007. The album has been certified platinum. It was nominated for the 2007 Mercury Prize.

The song "Wasteland" is also the background music for the Nike "Show Us Your 5" advertisement.

Reception

Initial critical response to Hats Off to the Buskers was positive. At Metacritic, which assigns a normalized rating out of 100 to reviews from mainstream critics, the album has received an average score of 75, based on 17 reviews.

Track listing
All songs written by Kyle Falconer and Kieren Webster.

 "Comin' Down" – 2:57
 "Superstar Tradesman" – 3:13
 "Same Jeans" – 3:33
 "Don't Tell Me" – 3:22
 "Skag Trendy" – 3:00
 "The Don" – 3:09
 "Face for the Radio" – 3:18
 "Wasted Little DJs" – 3:57
 "Gran's for Tea" – 2:33
 "Dance into the Night" – 3:05
 "Claudia" – 2:40
 "Street Lights" – 2:57
 "Wasteland" – 2:26
 "Typical Time" – 0:35
US release w/ bonus tracks:
 "Posh Boys"
 "Skag Trendy" (live at Abertay University, Dundee)
 "Same Jeans" (live at the Astoria, London)

Personnel
 Kyle Falconer – vocals, guitar, piano
 Kieren Webster – vocals, bass
 Pete Reilly – lead guitar
 Steven Morrison – drums

Charts

Weekly charts

Year-end charts

References

2007 debut albums
The View (band) albums
Albums produced by Owen Morris